The University of Lubumbashi, also known by the acronym UNILU, is one of the largest universities in the Democratic Republic of the Congo. It is located in Lubumbashi in Haut Katanga Province, previously Katanga Province. The campus is located in the northern part of the city, west of the airport.

History 
The university was created in 1955 under Belgian colonial rule as the Official University of the Congo and Ruanda-Urundi by the University of Liège and opened in 1956.
It was one of the institutions merged into the National University of Zaire in 1971. It was re-established as an autonomous university in 1981 when the National University of Zaire was split up.

The 1990 massacre
In May 1990 Zaire's government violently suppressed student protests on the campus, killing several students and destroying parts of the campus.

In early May 1990, students studying at the university protested against Mobutu's regime, demanding his resignation. On the night of 11 May 1990, electricity was cut off to the campus while a special military unit called Les Hiboux ("The Owls") were sent in, armed with machetes and bayonets. The unit's name came from the fact that the unit only operated at night. Little is known for certain about the nocturnal unit Les Hiboux, but their use of expensive vehicles (rarities in Zaire) to travel around strongly suggested that the unit was an elite force made of regime loyalists. Over the course of the night, the men of Les Hiboux bayoneted and hacked to pieces the protesting students. Those students who attempted to flee the campus were shot down. By the dawn of 12 May 1990, at least 290 students had been killed with the halls of the campus soaked in blood and dismembered human body parts.   The massacre led to the nations of the European Economic Community (now the European Union), the United States, and Canada to end all non-humanitarian aid to Zaire, which marked the beginning of the end of Western support for Mobutu. Zaire as the Congo was then known is a former Belgian colony and the massacre received much media attention in Belgium, which forced the Belgian government to criticise Mobutu.

Notable faculty  
 Edgar C. Polomé, linguist

Notable alumni 
 Christophe Munzihirwa Mwene Ngabo, Roman Catholic archbishop
 Sammy Baloji, award-winning photographer
 General William Yakutumba, rebel commander

Books

References

External links 
 UNILU homepage
Southern African University
 Archive University of Lubumbashi, Royal Museum for Central Africa

Universities in the Democratic Republic of the Congo
University of Lubumbashi
Educational institutions established in 1955
1955 establishments in the Belgian Congo